A Song for Summer is a romance novel by British author Eva Ibbotson, first published in 1997.  Eva Ibbotson is possibly best known as an award-winning and prolific author of children's books, but she also wrote many beloved romance novels for the adult market, of which A Song for Summer was the last. This novel and four others (A Countess Below Stairs, A Company of Swans, The Reluctant Heiress, and The Morning Gift) were reissued between 2007 and 2009 for the young adult market.

Synopsis
Set in early 1940s Austria, the novel centers around a young English woman named Ellen Carr.  Raised in a family of prominent suffragettes, Ellen, to the surprise of all friends and family, grows up with a great love of all things domestic.  Inspired by Henny, the servant/partner of her grandfather, she enjoys cooking, cleaning and the various other chores that her mother and aunts have abandoned in their academic and feminist pursuits.  While Ellen attends University to please her family, she leaves school before her final exams when Henny contracts cancer in order to be at her side.

After Henny's death, Ellen travels to Henny's homeland of Austria to become housemother at Hallendorf School, a progressive school for children stocked with characters of all sorts. Ellen soon finds that everything is not as it should be— the school is based on the Arts and is an institution for wealthy children; however, the parents of many of these children have used the school simply as a place out of sight and mind, in which to dump children that they see as nuisances.  Ellen takes on the role of mother to these children, giving them the love and encouragement that they deserve. In the beautiful Austrian countryside Ellen discovers an eccentric world occupied by wild children and even wilder teachers, experimental dancers and a tortoise on wheels. And then there is the particularly intriguing, enigmatic, and very handsome Marek: part-time gardener, fencing teacher, and the most romantic, compelling, swoon-worthy hero figure since Mr Darcy. Ellen is instantly attracted to the mysterious gardener, but Hitler’s Reich is already threatening their peaceful world.

But when she discovers that Marek is actually a famous musician working with various Resistances to smuggle Jews to safety, Ellen begins to realize the depth of her feelings for him—and the danger their newfound love faces in the shadow of war.

See also

References

1997 British novels
British romance novels
British young adult novels
Fiction set in the 1940s
Novels by Eva Ibbotson
Novels set in Austria
Novels set in schools
Century (imprint) books